Huolidao Station (Chinese: 活力岛) is a station of Line 4, Suzhou Rail Transit. The station is located in Xiangcheng District of Suzhou. It has been in use since April 15, 2017, the same time of the operation of Line 4.

References 

Railway stations in Jiangsu
Suzhou Rail Transit stations